Tyoply is a rural locality (a khutor) in Brezhnevsky Selsoviet Rural Settlement, Kursky District, Kursk Oblast, Russia. Population:

Geography 
The khutor is located 93.5 km from the Russia–Ukraine border, 24 km north-west of Kursk, 9.5 km from the selsoviet center – Verkhnekasinovo.

 Climate
Tyoply has a warm-summer humid continental climate (Dfb in the Köppen climate classification).

Transport 
Tyoply is located 5 km from the federal route  Crimea Highway (a part of the European route ), 6 km from the road of intermunicipal significance  ("Crimea Highway" – Verkhnyaya Medveditsa – Razinkovo), 23 km from the nearest railway halt Bukreyevka (railway line Oryol – Kursk).

The rural locality is situated 27 km from Kursk Vostochny Airport, 145 km from Belgorod International Airport and 226 km from Voronezh Peter the Great Airport.

References

Notes

Sources

Rural localities in Kursky District, Kursk Oblast